Cooney may refer to: Mahyar MIMB

 Cooney (name), people with a surname of Irish origin
 Cooney, New Mexico
 Cooney, Ohio